This is a list of characters from the long-running BBC children's series Grange Hill.

Pupils

* On joining the actors' union Equity at the age of 16, it was necessary for some Grange Hill actors to change their professional names to avoid confusion with existing artists with the same name.

Many of the original cast members from the first 2 series are credited as characters in 1982 yet appeared in many cases in only one scene with the majority appearing only in one episode and were not seen formally leaving the school.

Staff

 
 Since 2003, there has been a reluctance to give teachers first names or to expand their roles in the show beyond teaching or keeping pupils in line.
 Additionally, since around the mid-1990s, the number of teachers we see declines as their roles become more prominent, meaning that in the 2008 series there were only four members of staff (and only one actual teacher). 
 Two former pupils became staff members of Grange Hill in the show's final years. These were Taylor Mitchell, who became assistant caretaker, and Kathy McIlroy, who was appointed as a liaison officer to primary schools.

Parents

References

Lists of British television series characters
Grange Hill